Ethiopia is a federation subdivided into ethno-linguistically based regional states (Amharic: plural: ክልሎች kililoch; singular: ክልል kilil; Oromo: singular: Naannoo; plural: Naannolee) and chartered cities (Amharic: plural: አስተዳደር አካባቢዎች astedader akababiwoch; singular: አስተዳደር አካባቢ astedader akabibi). This system of administrative regions replaced the provinces of Ethiopia in 1992 under the Transitional Government of Ethiopia and was formalised in 1995 when the current Constitution of Ethiopia came into force.

The regions are each governed by a regional council whose members are directly elected to represent woredas (districts). Each council has a president, who is elected by the council. Each region also has an executive committee, whose members are selected by the president from among the councilors and approved by the council. Each region has a sector bureau, which implements the council mandate and reports to the executive committee.

There are eleven regional states and two chartered cities, the latter being the country's capital Addis Ababa, and Dire Dawa, which was chartered in 2004. Being based on ethnicity and language, rather than physical geography or history, the regions vary enormously in area and population; the most notable example is the Harari Region, which has a smaller area and population than either of the chartered cities. When they were established in 1992, there were more regions, but five regions were merged to form the multi-ethnic Southern Nations, Nationalities, and Peoples' Region later in 1992, following the first elections of regional councils on 21 June 1992.

The word "kilil" more specifically means "reservation" or "protected area". The ethnic basis of the regions and choice of the word "kilil" has drawn fierce criticism from those in opposition to the ruling party who have drawn comparisons to the bantustans of apartheid South Africa.

List of regions and city administrations

~ — Approximation

New regions
In November 2019, a referendum was held in the Sidama Zone of the Southern Nations, Nationalities, and Peoples' Region, in which voters supported a proposal for Sidama Zone to become a region in its own right. The Sidama Region was created in June 2020.

The South West Ethiopia Region was created on 23 November 2021 following a successful referendum earlier that year. The new region was split off from the SNNPR and consisted of Keffa, Sheka, Bench Sheko, Dawro, and West Omo Zones, along with Konta special district.

The Southern Ethiopia Region will be created in July 2023 following the 2023 South Ethiopia Region referendum, also from the SNNPR.

See also
 List of governors of the Regions of Ethiopia
 Flags of the regions of Ethiopia
 List of Ethiopian regions by Human Development Index
 ISO 3166-2:ET
 Subdivisions of Ethiopia

Notes

References

External links
 Regional maps of Ethiopia at UN-OCHA
 States of Ethiopia at Statoids

 
Subdivisions of Ethiopia
Regions
Ethiopia 1
Regions, Ethiopia